Mouhamadou Fallou Mbacke Sarr (born 5 January 1997) is a Senegalese professional footballer who plays as a goalkeeper for  club Cremonese. He also holds Italian citizenship.

Club career
Sarr made his Serie C debut for Prato on 4 October 2017 in a game against Carrarese.

On 6 July 2018, he went to Carrarese.

On 15 September 2020, Sarr joined Ascoli on loan until 30 June 2021.

On 27 August 2021, he went to Cremonese on permanent basis.

References

External links
 

Living people
1997 births
People from Kaolack
Italian people of Senegalese descent
Senegalese footballers
Association football goalkeepers
Serie B players
Serie C players
Bologna F.C. 1909 players
A.C. Prato players
Alma Juventus Fano 1906 players
Ascoli Calcio 1898 F.C. players
U.S. Cremonese players
Senegalese expatriate footballers
Senegalese expatriate sportspeople in Italy
Expatriate footballers in Italy